The ECO Cup was a football competition for members of Economic Cooperation Organization. Previously it was known as RCD Cup, RCD abbreviates Regional Corporation for Development and was an economic cooperation between Iran, Pakistan and Turkey from 1964 to 1979. A new organisation, ECO, was set up in 1985. In 1992, Afghanistan, Uzbekistan, Tajikistan, Turkmenistan, Kazakhstan, Kyrgyzstan and Azerbaijan joined ECO.

The countries that competed in one or more tournaments are Iran, Turkey, Pakistan, Kazakhstan, Kyrgyzstan, Tajikistan and Turkmenistan. Afghanistan and Uzbekistan never participated. Also Turkey did not participate in 1993 Tournament.  1993 was the last time this tournament was held.

Tournament format 
RCD Cup from 1964 to 1974 was a three nation tournament and it had a league format structure. ECO Cup 1993 was a seven nation tournament with two groups for a group stage, followed by semi-finals and final. There was no 3rd place match.

Medals (1965-1993)

Summary (1965-1993)

Participants

Comprehensive team results by tournament
Legend
 — Champions
 — Runners-up
 — Third place
SF — Semifinals (1993) 
R1 — Round 1
 — Did not enter / Withdrew
 — Hosts

For each tournament, the number of teams in each finals tournament (in brackets) are shown.

Notes

See also 
 Asian Football Confederation
 AFC Asian Cup
 AFF Championship
 EAFF East Asian Cup
 Arabian Gulf Cup
 SAFF Championship
 WAFF Championship

External links
RSSSF Page on RCD Cup tournament
RSSSF Page on ECO Cup tournament
TeamMelli.com page for squad list

 
International association football competitions in Asia